Kai Nyyssönen (born 10 June 1972) is a Finnish former footballer who played at both professional and international levels as a striker. After retiring as a player, Nyyssönen became a football manager.

His elder brother is fellow player Harri Nyyssönen.

Career

Playing career
Born in Kuopio, Nyyssönen played club football in Finland for KuPS, Haka, Hämeenlinna and PP-70, in Belgium for RWD Molenbeek, in Spain for Córdoba, in Scotland for Motherwell (where he scored once against Dundee United), and in Greece for Chania.

He also earned two caps for Finland between 1996 and 1997.

Coaching career
Nyyssönen managed KuPS between 2007 and 2009.

References

External links

1972 births
Living people
People from Kuopio
Finnish footballers
Finland international footballers
Finnish expatriate sportspeople in Spain
R.W.D. Molenbeek players
FC Haka players
FC Hämeenlinna players
Córdoba CF players
Motherwell F.C. players
Kuopion Palloseura players
Scottish Premier League players
Belgian Pro League players
Finnish expatriate footballers
Expatriate footballers in Belgium
Expatriate footballers in Spain
Expatriate footballers in Scotland
Expatriate footballers in Greece
Finnish football managers
Kuopion Palloseura managers
Association football forwards
Sportspeople from North Savo